The Sardinian lynx or Sardinian wildcat is an isolated population of feral cats (Felis catus) on the island of Sardinia, introduced during the Roman Empire. It has historically been misidentified as a Eurasian lynx (Lynx lynx) and an African wildcat (Felis lybica).

Under the name Felis lybica sarda, it is locally protected as a rare species.

Description as Lynx 

The Sardinian lynx with the scientific name Lynx sardiniae was proposed by the Italian biologist Pasquale Mola in 1908 for two zoological specimens of a cat from Nuoro in Sardinia that were part of the zoological collection of the University of Sassari. These specimens were reassessed in 1911 by Alessandro Ghigi who identified them as Sardinian wildcats (Felis lybica). Gighi's assessment was corroborated in 1981 by an Italian biologist who examined the still available mounted specimen initially described by Mola.

Their long and dense fur was fulvous on the back and whitish on the belly. He considered them to be a crossing of a lynx and a domestic cat.

Description as Felis 
The population was first described as a wildcat as Felis silvestris sarda . Following taxonomic changes around Felis lybica, an updated name is Felis lybica sarda. The term Felis silvestris lybica var. sarda, using an outdated name for the African wildcat, is also seen.

Results of zooarchaeological research indicate that Sardinian wild cats descended from domestic cats that were introduced around the beginning of the first millennium during the Roman Empire, and probably originated in the Near East.

See also 
 Corsican wildcat

References

Mammals described in 1908
Pleistocene carnivorans